Steve Bellisari (born April 21, 1980) is a former American football quarterback. He is best known for his time playing football at Ohio State University from 1998 to 2001.

College career
Bellisari, a special teams player and a defensive back his first year, replaced Joe Germaine as the Ohio State starting quarterback in 1999. He had a stellar prep career at Boca Raton High School, but had a disappointing career at Ohio State.

In contrast to the accurate Germaine, Bellisari was a more athletic, yet at times erratic thrower.  Notably, however, Bellisari's interception rate was 3.82%, lower than more highly recognized Ohio State quarterbacks Art Schlichter, Mike Tomczak, Greg Frey, and Bobby Hoying. Bellisari experienced an increasingly controversial tenure as Ohio State's starting quarterback, culminating in a one-game suspension towards the end of his senior season following an arrest for drunk driving. He was re-instated before the Michigan game, but did not start. Bellisari traveled with the team to the 2002 Outback Bowl against South Carolina, where he finished his career as a substitute, leading Ohio State back from a large deficit to tie the game before giving up an interception that allowed South Carolina to kick a winning field goal.

Statistics

Source:

Professional career
Bellisari was drafted by the St. Louis Rams in the 2002 NFL Draft and converted to safety. After being out of football, in 2005 Bellisari played for the Dayton Warbirds of the NIFL, an indoor football league, and later moved up to the Manchester Wolves in the second half of the 2005 af2 season, leading them into the playoffs with four straight victories to finish out the year. Seldom turning the ball over in his stay with the Wolves, Bellisari was driving the Wolves down the field late in the fourth quarter when he threw his last pass as a Wolf, a game-sealing interception to the Florida Firecats. The final score was Florida 40, Manchester 39.

AFL statistics

Stats from ArenaFan:

See also
 List of Arena Football League and National Football League players

References

External links
 AFL stats

1980 births
Living people
American football quarterbacks
American football safeties
Dayton Warbirds players
Kansas City Brigade players
Manchester Wolves players
New Orleans VooDoo players
Ohio State Buckeyes football players
St. Louis Rams players
Sportspeople from Boca Raton, Florida
Players of American football from Florida
Boca Raton Community High School alumni